In representation theory, the category of representations of some algebraic structure  has the representations of  as objects and equivariant maps as morphisms between them. One of the basic thrusts of representation theory is to understand the conditions under which this category is semisimple; i.e., whether an object decomposes into simple objects (see Maschke's theorem for the case of finite groups).

The Tannakian formalism gives conditions under which a group G may be recovered from the category of representations of it together with the forgetful functor to the category of vector spaces.

The Grothendieck ring of the category of finite-dimensional representations of a group G is called the representation ring of G.

Definitions 
Depending on the types of the representations one wants to consider, it is typical to use slightly different definitions.

 morphisms: equivariant maps
 composition: the composition of equivariant maps
 identities: the identity function (which is an equivariant map).

For a Lie group, one typically requires the representations to be smooth or admissible. For the case of a Lie algebra, see Lie algebra representation. See also: category O.

The category of modules over the group ring 

There is an isomorphism of categories between the category of representations of a group  over a field  (described above) and the category of modules over the group ring [], denoted []-Mod.

Category-theoretic definition 

Properties 

The category of linear representations of a group has a monoidal structure given by the tensor product of representations, which is an important ingredient in Tannaka-Krein duality (see below).

Restriction and induction 

and the other, the induction functor
.

,
a theorem called Frobenius reciprocity.

The basic question is whether the decomposition into irreducible representations (simple objects of the category) behaves under restriction or induction. The question may be attacked for instance by the Mackey theory.

Tannaka-Krein duality 

Tannaka–Krein duality concerns the interaction of a compact topological group and its category of linear representations. Tannaka's theorem describes the converse passage from the category of finite-dimensional representations of a group  back to the group , allowing one to recover the group from its category of representations. Krein's theorem in effect completely characterizes all categories that can arise from a group in this fashion. These concepts can be applied to representations of several different structures, see the main article for details.

Notes

References

External links 
 https://ncatlab.org/nlab/show/category+of+representations

Representation theory
Category theory